Panettieri is a village and comune in the province of Cosenza in the Calabria region of southern Italy.

Estimates put Panettieri's population between 310 and 330 in 2021.

It was probably founded in the mid-17th century.

References

Cities and towns in Calabria